Earth is the second recording from the progressive metal band Elitist.

Track listing

Personnel

Band
 Alex "DeHeart" (stage last name) - vocals
 Julian Rodriguez - guitar
 Sean Hall - guitar
 Mike Danese - bass
 Robert Platz - drums

Additional
Diego Farias - production

2011 EPs
Elitist (band) albums